Psilogramma papuensis is a moth of the  family Sphingidae. It is known from New Guinea and north-eastern Australia.

Subspecies
Psilogramma papuensis papuensis (New Guinea and north-eastern Australia)
Psilogramma papuensis aruensis Eitschberger, 2004 (Aru Archipelago)

References

Psilogramma
Moths described in 2001